Reed Eliot Slatkin (January 22, 1949 – June 23, 2015) was an initial investor and co-founder of EarthLink and the perpetrator of one of the largest Ponzi schemes in the United States since that conducted by Charles Ponzi himself.

Slatkin had been an ordained Scientology minister since 1975.  Around 1984, he changed from being a full-time minister to becoming a self-employed investor, and many of his investment clients and victims were also Scientologists.

Ponzi scheme
From 1986 to 2001, Slatkin raised approximately $593 million from about 800 wealthy investors. Using the funds from later investors, he paid one group of early investors $279M on their original $128M investment, citing investment success without actually making most of the claimed investments. He also distributed millions in fees to associates as "consultants".  He successfully sustained the scheme until 2001, when it was shut down by an investigation by the U.S. Securities and Exchange Commission (SEC). In May 2001, the SEC shut down Slatkin's scheme by filing an enforcement action and obtaining a temporary restraining order freezing his remaining assets.  On the same day as the SEC action, the Federal Bureau of Investigation executed search warrants relating to Slatkin.

The civil case was brought by the SEC in SEC v. Slatkin, Civil Action No. 01-04823 (C.D. Cal.).  The criminal case was brought by the U.S. Attorney for the Central District of California in U.S. v. Reed E. Slatkin, CR 02-313 (C.D. Cal.).

Among his victims were actors Joe Pantoliano, Anne Archer and Giovanni Ribisi (the latter two being Scientologists), producers Art Linson (father of high-ranking Scientologist Jenny Linson) and Armyan Bernstein, and two additional Scientologists, film composer Mark Isham and commentator Greta Van Susteren. as well as key people of EarthLink, including Scientologist Sky Dayton. He funneled millions of dollars to the Church of Scientology and their related entities.

Guilty plea and post-conviction
Slatkin pleaded guilty to mail fraud, wire fraud, money laundering, and obstruction of justice and on September 2, 2003, he was sentenced to 14 years in federal prison.

His Federal Bureau of Prisons registration number was 24057-112 and he was initially incarcerated at the low-security Taft Community Correctional Institution in Taft, California.  By 2010, he had been transferred to the low-security Lompoc Federal Correctional Institution in Lompoc, California.

Many of his victims were also Scientologists.  In his fraud case, his lawyers blamed his behavior on Scientology; but Scientology's lawyers from Latham & Watkins characterized Slatkin's explanations as "shameful" and having "sold the psychiatrists a bill of goods".

In July 2013, he was released from a halfway house in Long Beach, California.

On June 23, 2015, journalist Tony Ortega reported on his website that Slatkin had died from a heart attack. Ortega said that he had confirmation of Slatkin's death from Slatkin's ex-wife.

In popular culture
In February 2008, the television show American Greed featured the Slatkin case, which it titled "Stealing $$$ from Scientologists".

References

External links

Reed E. Slatkin sentenced to 14 years for running a $600 million Ponzi scheme and obstructing justice. U.S. Securities and Exchange Commission Litigation Release No. 18323, September 4, 2003.
Reed Slatkin Media Resource
Bankruptcy site set up by a group of Slatkin investors
Top 75 Net gainers of Slatkin ponzi scheme

1949 births
American money launderers
People convicted of obstruction of justice
20th-century American Jews
American Scientologists
Cranbrook Educational Community alumni
Pyramid and Ponzi schemes
Scientology-related controversies
American people convicted of fraud
American businesspeople convicted of crimes
2015 deaths
American members of the clergy convicted of crimes
21st-century American Jews